Bagnalliella is a genus of thrips in the family Phlaeothripidae.

Species
 Bagnalliella arizonae
 Bagnalliella australis
 Bagnalliella desertae
 Bagnalliella flavipes
 Bagnalliella glaucae
 Bagnalliella huachucae
 Bagnalliella mojave
 Bagnalliella robusta
 Bagnalliella yuccae

References

Phlaeothripidae
Thrips genera